Marvel Tales may refer to:

Comics 
 Marvel Tales (1949–1957), American comic-book series published by Marvel Comics and Atlas Comics; formerly Marvel Mystery Comics
 Marvel Tales (1964–1994), American comic-book series published by Marvel Comics
 Marvel Tales (2005–2007), American comic flip-magazine series published by Marvel Comics

Magazines 
 Marvel Tales (1934 magazine), American semi-professional science fiction magazine 
 Marvel Science Stories, pulp magazine titled Marvel Tales for part of its run